Ygnacio Valley High School (YVHS) is a public secondary school located in Concord, California, United States. It draws students from Concord as well as from the neighboring communities of Walnut Creek and Pleasant Hill. The school opened in 1962, and its first senior class graduated in 1964. Originally conceived as a temporary facility, the school currently carries an enrollment of over 1,500 total students for grades 9 through 12. When the nearby Northgate High School opened in 1974, YVHS lost approximately half its student body at the time. The school is part of the Mount Diablo Unified School District.

Academics 
Ygnacio Valley High School has been an IB World School since March 22, 2017. This school is the only school within the Mount Diablo Unified School District to offer the International Baccalaureate program. Some subjects offered are Spanish B, Mathematics, and History.

AP/Honors classes are also offered at Ygnacio Valley High School some such as Spanish and English Honors and AP World History.

Athletics 

Since 1964, one of the school's main athletic rivals has been the Clayton Valley High School Eagles.  The main rival was the College Park Falcons, until the schools were redistricted to prevent ongoing vengeful stunts that were hindering good sportsmanship in the early 2000s. YVHS also shares a lesser rivalry (as well as a property line) with neighboring De La Salle High School.

The first varsity Warrior football game played at the YVHS campus in 38 years took place on September 16, 2006. Ground was broken on a new running track and all-weather turf football and soccer field at YVHS in August 2005. Prior to the completion of the new field, most football home games were played at Mount Diablo High School or Diablo Valley College, due to poor field conditions, condemned bleachers, and a lack of lighting.

In December 2005, the YVHS football team won the NCS-2A championship against Miramonte High School for the second time since 1999. The following year the YVHS football team returned to the NCS playoffs  and lost in the second round.

In the 2009-10 football season, the YVHS football team won the DVAL League championship for the first time. The league had been created two years prior. The team then advanced to the NCS playoffs, losing in the second round to Eureka High School.

On March 14, 1987, the YVHS boys' basketball team won the Division 1 Northern California Championship at the Oakland Coliseum Arena, 56-54 (2OT) over James Logan High School. This marked the first time in history that an East Bay High School (east of the Caldecott tunnel) accomplished such a feat. The 1987 squad set and still holds the school record with 28 wins.

On February 29, 2020, the YVHS boys' soccer team won the North Coast Section Division 3 Championship for the second time in 5 years by a score of 3-2 over Albany High School.

Famous visits 

During the 1988 presidential campaign, then Vice President George Bush made an appearance at YVHS and addressed the student body.  In 1996, YVHS received another presidential visit when Bill Clinton and Vice President Al Gore made a rare joint appearance.  They visited the campus as part of the NetDay '96 event, which kicked off a drive to connect California public schools to the Internet.

YVHS is an ideal location for such high-security visits, due to the limited entry points into school property.

In the early 1990s, YVHS also received visits from U.S. Representatives George Miller and Bill Baker, sponsored by the school's now-defunct Public Policy Society.

Ongoing issues 
The school mascot, the Warrior, is represented as a Native American spear going through the letter ‘W’ (for Warriors). Similar mascots representing Native American culture are often a point of contention throughout the state of California, where over 100 high schools have American Indian mascots.

YVHS is occasionally cited in the ongoing school prayer debate, after allowing Muslim students to use an available room for prayer during Ramadan in 2004.

Notable alumni 
 Mike Bellotti - University of Oregon athletic director
 Lance Blankenship - member of 1989 World Series champion Oakland Athletics
Ian Brennan (music producer, author) - Grammy-award-winning music producer and author
Matt Chesse - Academy-award nominated film editor
 Jonathan Dayton - director of Little Miss Sunshine
 Kiko Garcia - shortstop; played for Baltimore Orioles in the 1979 World Series
 Kristin Heaston - shot put athlete; in 2004 became the first female Olympic athlete to compete in Olympia, Greece
 Glenn Helzer - convicted murderer and former cult leader
 Damian Jackson - former infielder for the Washington Nationals and other teams
 Carl Ryanen-Grant - UC Berkeley University Medalist in 1997; received widespread attention for his battle with malignant melanoma
 Dave Tollefson - defensive end; played for the New York Giants in Super Bowl XLII
 Chris Walsh - retired Buffalo Bills and Minnesota Vikings wide receiver

References

External links

YVHS home page
YVHS Choirs
YVHS Instrumental Music Boosters
Mt. Diablo Unified School District
Photo gallery from 1996 Clinton/Gore visit to YVHS
Website of the YVHS Class of 1969
Website of the YVHS Class of 1979

Educational institutions established in 1960
Mount Diablo Unified School District
High schools in Contra Costa County, California
Public high schools in California
1960 establishments in California